Ludde Gentzel (17 January 1885 – 5 March 1963) was a Swedish film actor and singer. He appeared in more than 30 films between 1916 and 1955.

Selected filmography
 Ship Ahoy! (1931)
 Adventure in Pyjamas (1935)
 Styrman Karlssons flammor (1938)
 Sun Over Sweden (1938)
 Career (1938)
 Good Friends and Faithful Neighbours (1938)
 The Word (1943)
 We Need Each Other (1944)
 Dolly Takes a Chance (1944)
 Oss tjuvar emellan eller En burk ananas (1945)
 It Rains on Our Love (1946)
 When the Meadows Blossom (1946)
 Robinson in Roslagen (1948)

References

External links

1885 births
1963 deaths
Swedish male film actors
Swedish male silent film actors
20th-century Swedish male actors
People from Jönköping
Swedish male singers